Garry Madders (born 21 January 1953) is an Australian cricketer. He played in three first-class and two List A matches for Queensland in 1979/80.

See also
 List of Queensland first-class cricketers

References

External links
 

1953 births
Living people
Australian cricketers
Queensland cricketers
People from Maryborough, Queensland
Cricketers from Queensland